Lake Minnetonka (Dakota: Mní iá Tháŋka) is a lake located about  west-southwest of Minneapolis, Minnesota. Lake Minnetonka has about 23 named bays and areas. The lake lies within Hennepin and Carver counties and is surrounded by 13 incorporated municipalities. At , it is Minnesota's ninth largest lake. It is a popular spot for local boaters, sailors, and fishermen.

History

Early history 
The first people who inhabited the Lake Minnetonka area were indigenous natives who migrated to the region at the end of the last ice age circa 8000 BCE. Later peoples who inhabited the area between 3500 BCE and 1500 CE are commonly referred to collectively as the "Mound Builders" because they constructed large land features serving spiritual, ceremonial, burial, and elite residential functions. The Mound Builder culture reached its apex circa 1150 CE and ceased to exist circa 1500 CE.

By the 1700s Lake Minnetonka was inhabited by the Mdewakanton people, a subtribe of the Dakota Nation. Although their primary settlements lay within the Minnesota River Valley, the Mdewakanton frequented Lake Minnetonka to hunt, fish, and harvest wild rice and maple sap. Spirit Knob, a peninsula near present-day Wayzata, held spiritual significance for the Mdewakanton. Following the Dakota War of 1862, however, the Dakota were forced to leave the area.

The first White Americans known to have visited Lake Minnetonka were two teenage boys, Joe Brown and Will Snelling, who canoed up Minnehaha Creek from Fort Saint Anthony in 1822. However, few other Euro-Americans visited the lake or even knew of its existence for three subsequent decades.

Lake Minnetonka was officially named by Minnesota's territorial governor, Alexander Ramsey, in 1852. He had been informed that the Dakota used the phrase Mní iá Tháŋka (“the-water-they-speak-of-is-large” in the Dakota language) to refer to the lake. Excelsior, the lake's first white settlement, was established the following year. The first steamboat on Lake Minnetonka, a small side-wheel steamer named Governor Ramsey, was launched in 1861. Travel to Lake Minnetonka remained relatively difficult, however, until the Saint Paul and Pacific Railroad extended a line to Wayzata in 1867.

Peter Gideon, an early Minnesota horticulturist, moved to the Lake Minnetonka area in 1853. In 1868 he successfully bred a species of apple that could withstand Minnesota's harsh winters and named it the "Wealthy" in honor of his wife. This breakthrough made possible the later developments of the Haralson and Honeycrisp apples in 1913 and 1974, respectively.

Resort years 

The construction of hotels and boarding houses near Lake Minnetonka boomed during the 1870s and early 1880s. The first large hotel on the lake, the Hotel Saint Louis in Deephaven, was built in 1879 and boasted 150 guest rooms with private verandas. The larger Lake Park Hotel was completed in Tonka Bay later that year. The largest hotel ever built on Lake Minnetonka, the Hotel Lafayette in Minnetonka Beach, opened in 1882. Many guests hailed from the Deep South and spent entire summers on the lake to enjoy its scenery and cooler climate.

Large steamboats also proliferated on Lake Minnetonka during this time. The first inland steamboat ever to be equipped with electric lights, City of Saint Louis, was assembled in Wayzata in 1881 and began servicing lakeside communities and resorts later that year. The largest vessel ever to operate on Lake Minnetonka, Belle of Minnetonka, was launched and put into service in 1882.

The lake's first yacht club, the Minnetonka Yacht Club, was founded in 1882 in Deephaven. Hazen Burton, one of the club's original co-founders, is credited for commissioning the development of the racing scow. When he debuted the first racing scow, Onawa, in 1893, it was disqualified for winning nearly every regatta it entered. The rules were eventually modified, however, and racing scows became popular within the sailing community worldwide. Onawa is currently displayed at the Excelsior-Lake Minnetonka Historical Society Museum in Excelsior.

Many of Lake Minnetonka's visitors began finding new places to vacation as the railroads expanded westward in the 1890s, causing most of the lake's hotels and steamboats to suffer financially and cease operations. Some hotels burned during this time, but most were demolished or dismantled. By 1900, however, an increasing number of families had begun to construct private summer cottages around Lake Minnetonka. Permanent homes and grand country estates also began to appear around the lake as the Twin Cities metropolitan area grew. Some of these homes and cottages still exist, including the Thompson Summer House in Minnetonka Beach.

Golden years 

In 1905 the Twin City Rapid Transit Company (TCRT) extended a streetcar line to the village of Excelsior on Lake Minnetonka's southern shore. The lake saw dramatic change in 1906 as TCRT also opened Big Island Park on Big Island and debuted its Express Boat service. The Express Boats, casually referred to as “streetcar boats,” were essentially floating streetcars that served the lake's summer residents. Six (and later seven) of these steamboats connected 26 landings around the lake to Excelsior, where passengers could transfer onto streetcars bound for the Twin Cities. Many streetcar boat passengers were lakeside residents commuting to their jobs in Minneapolis and Saint Paul. Tourists, on the other hand, could board one of three large ferry boats bound for Big Island Park, where they could picnic, enjoy live music, and ride several attractions. However, TCRT closed Big Island Park in 1911 due to its excessive operating and maintenance costs.

Ridership on the streetcar boats began to plummet when roads were improved in the area in the early 1920s. Steamboat service on Lake Minnetonka grew evermore limited during this time, and by 1926 TCRT had suspended all steamboat service on the lake. To rid itself of the vessels, TCRT scuttled three of the seven streetcar boats in deep water north of Big Island that summer. Three of the other boats were scrapped shortly thereafter, and one was sold and used as an excursion boat until it, too, was scuttled in 1949. Streetcar service to Excelsior continued until 1932.

Crane Island, an island near the western shore of the lake, was organized as a summer cottage retreat in 1907. The Crane Island Association platted a number of lots around the perimeter of the island and dedicated a commons area at its center. Many of the island's original cottages remain, and today it is a historic district listed on the National Register of Historic Places.

Several of the area's most prestigious country clubs, including the Lafayette Club, Minnetonka Country Club, and Woodhill Country Club, were also founded during this period.

Late 20th century 
Fred W. Pearce, a well-known amusement park operator, opened Excelsior Amusement Park in Excelsior in 1925. Attractions included a fun house, the Silver Streak, the Scrambler, a carousel, picnic accommodations, and a roller coaster called the Cyclone. The Rolling Stones performed live at the park's Danceland pavilion in 1964 for a crowd of approximately 300. Excelsior Amusement Park continued to be a tourist destination until it closed in 1973. Today the site is occupied by a condominium complex and Maynards Restaurant.

In 1926 architect Frank Lloyd Wright and his mistress Olga Hinzengberg were arrested for allegedly violating the Mann Act while vacationing at a cottage in Tonka Bay. The charges were soon dropped after allegations against them were found untrue.

Before gaining national fame in the early 1940s, LaVerne, Maxene, and Patty Andrews of The Andrews Sisters spent their summers with relatives in Mound, a town in an area known as Westonka. The trio often returned to the area later in life as well.

In 1946 Mound Metalcraft was established in Mound. The company changed its name to Tonka Toys in the 1950s, when it became known for manufacturing toy trucks. Tonka Toys was purchased by Hasbro in 1991 and is no longer based in Minnesota.

Two F4 tornadoes ravaged the Lake Minnetonka area during the tornado outbreak of 1965, causing much damage in the communities of Mound, Navarre, and Deephaven. Hundreds of homes and many local businesses were destroyed during the outbreak.

The steamboat Minnehaha, one of the streetcar boats scuttled in 1926, was raised from the bottom of Lake Minnetonka in 1980, restored, and returned to service by 1996. Now operated by the Museum of Lake Minnetonka, Minnehaha once again carries passengers between the communities of Excelsior and Wayzata as she did over a century ago.

National Historic Districts and Places 
The Lake Minnetonka area is home to two National Historic Districts: the Crane Island Historic District and The Water Street Historic District in the community of Excelsior. It is also home to 6 National Register of Historic Places sites.

Natural history and limnology

Geography 
Lake Minnetonka was formed approximately 10,000 years ago as the Laurentide Ice Sheet receded northward. Lake Minnetonka is divided into two halves, the Upper Lake in the west and the Lower Lake in the east, which reflect the easterly flow of water in the lake's watershed.

Lake Minnetonka bays and lakes 

Black Lake
Brown's Bay
Carman's/Old Channel Bay
Carson's Bay
Cook's Bay
Crystal Bay
East Upper Lake
Emerald Lake
Excelsior Bay
Forest Lake
Gideon's Bay
Gray's Bay
Halsted's Bay
Harrison's Bay
Jenning's Bay
Lafayette Bay
Libb's Lake
Maxwell Bay
North Arm Bay
North Lower Lake
Peavy Lake
Phelp's Bay
Priest's Bay
Robinson's Bay
St. Alban's Bay
St. Louis Bay
Seton Lake
Smith's Bay
Smithtown Bay
South Lower Lake & Echo Bay
South Upper Lake
Spring Park Bay
Stubb's Bay
Tanager Lake
Wayzata Bay
West Arm Bay
West Upper Lake

Hydrology 
Several streams flow into Lake Minnetonka, the largest of which is Six Mile Creek. The only outlet from the lake is Minnehaha Creek. There have been a number of droughts throughout Lake Minnetonka's history, notably during the 1930s and late 1980s.

The median "ice-out" date, which has been recorded on Lake Minnetonka since 1855, is April 14. The earliest recorded ice-out date was March 11, 1878, and the latest recorded ice-out date was May 8, 1856. Water surface temperatures typically peak at around 80°F (26.7°C) in early August.

Freshwater biology 
Lake Minnetonka contains black bullhead, black crappie, bluegill, bowfin, common carp, green sunfish, hybrid sunfish, largemouth bass, muskellunge, northern pike, pumpkinseed, rock bass, smallmouth bass, walleye, white sucker, yellow bullhead, and yellow perch. Some fish consumption guidelines have been placed on the lake's bluegill, common carp, largemouth bass, northern pike, and walleye.

Sightings of the sturgeon, which is often referred to as "Lou," have been persistent since the 1980s. In 2019 a large sturgeon was caught by two boys on Minnehaha Creek. The Minnesota DNR speculated that it could have originated from Lake Minnetonka.

Environmental issues 
Lake Minnetonka's environmental issues became a concern after curly-leaf pondweed was discovered in its waters in 1900. Purple loosestrife was discovered in the lake in 1940, as was Eurasian water milfoil in 1987. Zebra mussels were discovered in the lake in 2010.

Lake Minnetonka suffered from significant sewage, fertilizer, and surface runoff pollution until the 1970s. Conditions have since improved, but pollution from fertilizer and surface runoff remains an ongoing issue. Water quality is now closely monitored.

It is not uncommon for some Lake Minnetonka beaches to be temporarily closed due to elevated levels of E. coli contamination. An outbreak of an unidentified waterborne pathogen sickened at least 116 swimmers at Cruiser's Cove, a popular party spot near Big Island, in 2019.

Lake Minnetonka's environment is currently overseen by three separate agencies. These include the Minnehaha Creek Watershed District, the Lake Minnetonka Conservation District, and the Minnesota Department of Natural Resources.

Attractions and activities
 Some of the most visited attractions on Lake Minnetonka are restaurants. Al & Alma's Supper Club and Charter Cruises was founded in Mound in 1956 and is Lake Minnetonka's oldest continually-operated restaurant and cruise line. Lord Fletcher's restaurant in Spring Park has been one of Lake Minnetonka's most popular establishments since opening in 1968. Maynards Restaurant, established in Excelsior in 1998, is another popular waterfront restaurant. Downtown Excelsior and Wayzata have since become Twin Cities culinary destinations as many new restaurants continue to appear there.

The Old Log Theater, located in Greenwood, first opened in 1940 and is now Minnesota's oldest professional theater organization. Alumni of the theater include actors Nick Nolte and Loni Anderson.

Lake Minnetonka is home to several regional parks owned by Three Rivers Park District. The largest among these are Lake Minnetonka Regional Park in Minnetrista and Noerenberg Gardens in Orono. Three Rivers Park District also maintains two regional bike trails near the lake. Two other large public parks on Lake Minnetonka include Big Island Nature Park and the Excelsior Commons.

Boating, sailing, and fishing are the most common activities on Lake Minnetonka. Boats of all sizes and horsepower may be legally launched on Lake Minnetonka, but speed and noise restrictions do apply. The lake has four active yacht clubs and an antique and classic boat society known as the Bob Speltz Land O' Lakes Chapter of the ACBS. Several cruise companies operate larger excursion vessels on the lake, the largest of which is Al & Alma's  Bella Vista. Lake Minnetonka's magnificent homes are a common highlight on these sightseeing, dinner, and brunch cruises.

Other activities on Lake Minnetonka include swimming, kayaking, and standup paddleboarding during the summer, and ice fishing, snowmobiling, and ice yachting during the winter.

Several community festivals are held around the lake each year. Some of the larger events include James J. Hill Days in Wayzata, Apple Day in Excelsior, and the Spirit of the Lakes Festival in Mound.

In popular culture  
Thurlow Lieurance's song "By the Waters of Minnetonka" was published by the Theodore Presser Company in 1913 and has since been recorded by artists such as Glenn Miller and Desi Arnaz.

It is speculated that Jimmy Hutmaker, a resident of Excelsior, inspired Mick Jagger to write the 1969 Rolling Stones song "You Can't Always Get What You Want" after a chance encounter with the star at a local drugstore in 1964. However, this claim has long been disputed.

Singer-songwriter Bonnie Raitt's self-titled debut album was recorded at an abandoned summer camp on Lake Minnetonka's Enchanted Island in 1971.

Several scenes from the 1972 films The Heartbreak Kid and Slaughterhouse-Five were filmed at Lake Minnetonka.

Perhaps the best known association is that with local music icon Prince. His third album, Dirty Mind, was recorded at a home on Lake Minnetonka's North Arm in 1980. Prince rented and lived at the home between 1979 and early 1981. He ultimately settled in Chanhassen, approximately two miles south of Lake Minnetonka, in 1987. Lake Minnetonka is famously mentioned in the 1984 film Purple Rain during a scene in which The Kid (Prince) tells his love interest (Apollonia Kotero) to "purify [herself] in the waters of Lake Minnetonka." After she enters the water, Prince reveals that the water she has entered is not actually Lake Minnetonka. Dave Chappelle mocked the scene in a 2004 episode of Chappelle's Show when he asked (as Prince), "Why don't you purify yourself in the waters of Lake Minnetonka?" while winning a basketball game.

In an episode of the television series Beverly Hills 90210, Dylan (Luke Perry) tells Brenda (Shannen Doherty) that his privileged background enabled him to spend summers in Paris as a child. Brenda reacts by saying "You mean you went to Paris every summer? We went to Lake Minnetonka!"

Lake Minnetonka received some unwanted national attention in October 2005 following an incident known as the Minnesota Vikings boat party scandal.

Lake Minnetonka was briefly featured in the reality television series Keeping Up with the Kardashians in 2011.

Shots of Lake Minnetonka were included in the lyric video for the 2015 song "Cool for the Summer" by Demi Lovato.

Several scenes from the 2017 film Wilson were filmed at Lake Minnetonka.

In insurance, lake side properties of Lake Minnetonka's shore side is considered to be the front door, rather than the road side, called the Waterfront (area).

See also 
 List of lakes of Minnesota
 Excelsior, Minnesota
 Wayzata, Minnesota
 Westonka
 Minnehaha (steamboat)
 Minnehaha Creek Watershed District

References

External links 

 Lake information
 Minnehaha Creek Watershed District
 Lake Minnetonka Conservation District

Minnetonka
Minnetonka
Minnetonka
Tourist attractions in Hennepin County, Minnesota
Tourist attractions in Carver County, Minnesota
Kettle lakes in the United States